Greya subalba is a moth of the family Prodoxidae. In North America it is found in southern British Columbia, Alberta, Washington, Oregon, northern Idaho, western Montana and south to south-western Oregon. The habitat consists of dry, forb-rich steppe.

The wingspan is 11–16 mm. The forewings of the males are uniformly white and yellowish white in females. The hindwings are light gray and somewhat darker than the forewing.

The larvae feed on Lomatium species. Young larvae feed on the developing seeds of their host plant.

References

Moths described in 1921
Prodoxidae